Andrew Russell (14 January 1809  – 10 December 1867) was a politician in colonial Victoria (Australia) and a Mayor of Melbourne.

Russell was born in Glasgow, Scotland, and arrived in the Port Phillip District around 1841 and  established a wholesale wine and spirit business in Melbourne.

On 31 August 1851  Russell was appointed a nominated member (and sworn-in in November 1851) of the Victorian Legislative Council, a position he held until the original Council was abolished in 1856.

Russell died in Boulogne-sur-Mer, France on 10 December 1867.

References

1808 births
1867 deaths
Members of the Victorian Legislative Council
Scottish emigrants to Australia
Mayors and Lord Mayors of Melbourne
19th-century Australian politicians